Dicepolia artoides is a moth in the family Crambidae. It was described by James E. Hayden in 2009. It is found on the eastern slopes of the Andes from Bolivia to Venezuela. It has also been recorded from French Guiana.

References

Moths described in 2009
Odontiinae